To Nisi (Greek: Το Νησί; English: The Island) is a Greek television series based on the best-selling English novel The Island by Victoria Hislop airing on Mega Channel. The series premiered on 11 October 2010 to record ratings and critical acclaim. It is the most expensive Greek television production ever with a budget of €4 million.

Production

Conception
The series is one of the most expensive television shows in Greek television history with a budget of €4 million. The Island author Victoria Hislop had previously received offers from Hollywood as high as £300,000 for the movie rights to the novel, although she opted instead to grant the rights to Mega Channel for a fraction of the price in return for some artistic control.

Initial thoughts by Mega Channel were to make a film out of the novel, but they finally decided upon a 26 episode television series instead. Mirella Papaeconomou primarily took on the script's adaptation, and with Hislop's permission added stories and characters that do not exist in the novel to make the series long enough for a full season. Hislop actively participated in the entire process with ideas, suggestions, and observations. Thodoris Papadoulakis undertook the direction of the series.

Filming

The direction of photography was undertaken by Vaggelis Katrizidakis. Cretan director Thodoris Papadoulakis convinced Mega Channel to keep Athens out of the filming by having the entire series shot on location in Crete, arguing that Spinalonga recreates a natural setting. Filming began in December 2009 and concluded in December 2010, primarily taking place in Plaka, Spinalonga, upper Elounda, and Agios Nikolaos.

Sets portraying the villages from 1939 to 1957 were designed by stage director Antonis Halkias and his colleagues. For authenticity purposes, as many scenes as possible were shot on location in Plaka and Spinalonga, including scenes of the port where the boat from the small fishing village of Plaka arrives, as well as the market streets. Shooting for many of the segments in Old Plaka took place in constructed sets resembling the old village in upper Elounda.

Costuming and music
Xanthi Kontou and Maria Kontodima undertook the costuming for the series. In order to gain an accurate portrayal of the period between 1939 and 1957, Kontou and Kontodima researched the styles for eight months resulting in about 2,000 unique costumes.
The theme song for the series Ise Esi O Anthropos Mou performed by Andriana Babali is a cover by Minos Matsas of a 1950 song (S.Peristeris-M.Margaritis), originally performed by Sotiria Bellou. This was released prior to the series, in Andriana Babali's The Rose Tattoo album (Minos EMI ©2009).
The principal composer of the series musical score is Minos Matsas. The official album Soundtrack was released on 4 December 2010 by Minos EMI and contain songs performed by Dimitris Mitropanos, Andriana Babali, Eleonora Zouganeli and Giannis Haroulis.

Synopsis

Based on the novel The Island by Victoria Hislop, the series takes place on the island of Spinalonga, off the coast of Crete, and in the village of Plaka which lies within swimming distance across it. To Nisi tells the story of Alexis Fielding, a woman on the cusp of a life-changing decision. Alexis knows little about her family's past and has always resented her mother for refusing to discuss it. She knows only that her mother, Sofia, grew up in Plaka, a small Cretan village, before moving to London, England. Making her first visit to Crete to see the village where her mother was born, Alexis discovers that the village of Plaka faces the small, now deserted island of Spinalonga, which she is surprised to learn was Greece's leper colony for much of the 20th century. At Plaka, Alexis meets an old friend of her mother's, Fotini, who is prepared to tell her the entire tragic story of her family that Sofia has spent her life concealing—the story of Eleni, her grandmother, and of a family torn apart by war and passion. Alexis discovers how intimately she is connected with the island, along with the horror and pity of the leper colony which was once there.

Cast and characters
There are more than 120 roles in the series, with more than 500 supporting actors.

Main characters
Stelios Mainas as Giorgos Petrakis, a fisherman who lives in Plaka with his wife Eleni and two daughters Maria and Anna.
Katerina Lehou as Eleni Petraki, Giorgos' wife and the schoolteacher of Plaka. 
Aimilios Heilakis as Manolis Vandoulakis, Alexandos Vandoulakis's nephew
Alexandros Logothetis as Nikos Kiritsis, a doctor at the hospital in Heraklion and Dr. Lapakis's friend.
Gioulika Skafida (adult), Anastasia Tsilimpiou (child), as Maria Petraki, Giorgos and Eleni's daughter and Anna's sister. 
Evgenia Dimitropoulou (adult) and Ifigeneia Tzola (child) as Anna Petraki, Giorgos and Eleni's youngest daughter and Maria's sister
Evgenia Dimitropoulou as Alexis Fielding, Sofia's daughter and Eleni's great granddaughter.
Giannis Stankoglou as Andreas Vandoulakis, Alexandros Vandoulakis's son, a rich land owner.
Filareti Kominou (adult), Nefeli Kouri (teenager) and Despina Kiapekou (child) as Sofia Fielding, Anna's daughter and Alexis's mother. 
Olga Damani (old), Annita Kouli (teenager) and Rene Tzola (child) as Foteini Angelopoulou, Maria's best friend. 
Dina Michailidi as Savina Angelopoulou, Pavlos's wife and mother of Foteini and Antonis. 
Grigoris Orfanoudakis as Pavlos Angelopoulos, Savina's husband and father of Foteini and Antonis. 
Theodoros Katsafados as Petros Kontomaris, the elected head of Spinalonga. 
Marinella Vlachaki as Elpida Kontomari, Petros Kontomaris's wife.
Nektarios Loukianos (adult) and Manos Tsangarakis (child) as Dimitris Lemonias, one of the brightest students in Eleni's classroom.
Katerina Misichroni (adult) and Kallisti Bertacha (child) as Elektra Vlahaki, Dimitiris's companion during childhood games and later becomes his companion in life. 
Nikos Orfanos as Christos Lapakis, the doctor in Spinalonga. 
Tasos Nousias as Nikos Papadimitriou, a lawyer who is transported to Spinalonga along with other lepers from Athens. 
Maria Protopappa as Evgenia Kapetanaki, Eleni's friend and Plaka's baker. 
Orfeas Avgoustidis (adult) and Antipas Ntamotsidis (child) as Antonis Angelopoulos, Savina's and Pavlos' son. 
Ian Hislop as Marcus Fielding, Sofia's British husband

Episodes

International syndication

Impact and reception

Ratings
Upon its premiere, To Nisi set record ratings for a series with an estimated 3.88 million total viewers tuning in, or 34.9% of the viewing population in Greece. The share rating amounted to 61.7%, meaning approximately six out of every ten viewers watching television at the time were tuned into To Nisi, while also receiving 72.8% share rating in the coveted 15–44 age group. The premiere beat the previous total viewers record of 34.6% set in 1998 by Mega Channel's series Psithiroi Kardias. Upon the airing of the second episode, To Nisi beat its own record, receiving an estimated 4.02 million total viewers, or 36.2%.

Critical reception
Critical reception of the television series was highly positive. During a pre-screening for the press at Athens Concert Hall, the show received critical acclaim. The series was also reportedly being eyed by foreign networks.

Popi Diamantakou of Ta Nea stated that the work of the director and the actors exceeded expectations. Marianna Tziantzi of Kathimerini asserted that the astronomical ratings received for the first episode prove that the series will be the television phenomenon of the year; a title well deserved as it is artistically ambitious during a period of subpar television productions on air. She added that the book- and the television series as an extension- provide an unintentional allegory of our time; speaking of love in a time of crisis and social exclusion. Also commenting on its record viewership and differentiation qualities, Marina Petroutsou of Eleftherotypia pointed out that the public eagerly awaited a quality production, as the networks have been using the economic crisis as an excuse for low quality programs. She also noted that the day after the premiere, many daytime shows covered the series, leading her to believe that it was seen as a means to boost their own ratings. Afroditi Grammeli of To Vima observed that from the first minutes of the series on air, a flow of commentary praising the series broke out across the internet, notably through the creation of three social networking groups on Facebook that accepted thousands of members within the time frame of the premiere. Praise was given for its touching and atmospheric shots, solid acting, exceptional direction, and stunning stage design. Contrastingly, Grammeli also regarded that the mass praise did not come without negative criticism by a minority, who found the series depressing, slow, old fashioned, and overly dramatic.

References

External links

Official facebook

Mega Channel original programming
Greek-language television shows
2010 Greek television series debuts
Greek drama television series
2011 Greek television series endings
2010s Greek television series
Television shows filmed in Greece